AbdulRahman AbdulRazaq (born 5 February 1960) is a Nigerian politician, who has served as governor of Kwara State since 2019. 

He was previously the CEO of First Fuels Limited. He contested unsuccessfully for the governor of Kwara State in 2003, 2007 and 2011 respectively under the Congress for Progressive Change political party and was successively defeated by Abubakar Bukola Saraki in 2003 and 2007, and by Abdulfatah Ahmed in 2011. However in 2019, he contested again under the ruling political party in Nigeria, the All Progressive Congress, and emerged as the governor of Kwara State, after he won the 2019 governorship election in the state. In 2021 he introduces KwaraLEARN in basic education to empower teachers.

Early life 
He was born in Ilorin West Local Government. AbdulRahman is the son of Alh. A. G. F. AbdulRazaq SAN., the first northern lawyer in Nigeria.

He attended Capital School, Kaduna between 1966 and 1968; Bishop Smith Memorial School Ilorin between 1970 and 1971; and Government College Kaduna where he is said to have earned his West African Senior School Certificate Examination in 1976 (WASSCE).

Career

Politics 
He joined politics in 1999 when Nigeria returned to democracy. In 2011, he unsuccessfully contested for the governorship election in Kwara State on the platform of Congress for Progressive Change (CPC) and again contested unsuccessfully for Kwara Central Senatorial District on the platform of Peoples Democratic Party (PDP) in both 2011 and 2015. He won the gubernatorial primary election of the All Progressive Congress for Kwara State in October 2018.

He was elected as governor of Kwara State at the 2019 governorship election held on 9 March 2019 and sworn in on 29 May 2019.

Personal life 
He is married to Olufolake Molawa Davies Abdulrazaq and the couple have three sons.

References

Living people
1960 births
Nigerian Muslims
People from Zaria
All Progressives Congress state governors of Nigeria